John Read may refer to:

Politicians
John Read (Mississippi politician) (born 1941), member of the Mississippi House of Representatives
John Read (Connecticut politician) (1633–1730), member of the Connecticut House of Representatives from Norwalk
John Read (Australian politician) (born 1939), member of the Legislative Assembly of Western Australia
John Read (New Zealand politician) (1874–1942), local body politician and trade unionist
J. Meredith Read (1837–1896), United States diplomat
John Kingsley Read (1936–1985), chairman of the British National Front and a founder of the National Party
John Milton Read (1842–1881), American printer and politician

Others
John Read (pirate) (fl. 1683–1688), British privateer, buccaneer, and pirate
John Read (chemist) (1884–1963), British chemist
John M. Read (1797–1874), American lawyer
John Read (British Army officer) (1917–1987)
John Read (businessman) (1918–2015), British businessman
John Read (lawyer) (1769–1854), United States lawyer and banker
John Read (producer) (1920–2006), collaborator with Gerry Anderson
John Read (surgeon) (fl. 1588), English medical writer
John Read (art film maker) (1923–2011), producer of art documentaries for the BBC from 1951 to 1983
John Read (psychologist), psychologist and mental health researcher
John Read (skier) (born 1961), British Olympic skier
John Erskine Read (1888–1973), Canadian lawyer, academic, civil servant, and judge
John Read (inventor), inventor who developed a rotating doubler electrostatic generator
John Dawson Read, English singer-songwriter
John Read (snooker player), English snooker player
John Read (bobsleigh) (1926–2000), British bobsledder
John D. Read (1814–1864), American abolitionist and lay preacher

Jack Read
Jack Read (coastwatcher) (1905–1992), coastwatcher during World War II
Jack Read (rugby) (fl. 1925–1936), rugby union and rugby league footballer

See also
John Reed (disambiguation)
John Reid (disambiguation)
John Reade (disambiguation)
John Rede (disambiguation)